Maximus/Minimus was a food truck based in Seattle, Washington. It was established by Kurt Beecher Dammeier in June 2009 and the truck was designed by Colin Reedy. Dammeier also owns the truck and enterprise. The truck was built to resemble a pig, and has metallic enhancements that resemble a pig's snout and ears. The truck often parked at 6th Avenue and Pike Street in downtown Seattle, and at festivals and farmer's markets. Maximus Minimus announced on Facebook in April 2017 that it would not be opening.

Fare
The truck offered pork dishes, such as pulled pork sandwiches, chicken and vegetarian sandwiches, macaroni and cheese, pozole and coleslaw. Dishes were available in bold (maximus) and light (minimus) styles, based upon the types of sauces used. The maximus sauce was prepared with peppers, onion, fruit juice and beer, and was stronger and spicier in flavor, while the milder minimus sauce was prepared with tamarind, molasses and honey and had a sweet flavor. The truck used cheese sourced from Beecher's Handmade Cheese, an artisan cheesemaker and retail shop founded by Dammeier and based in the Pike Place Market in Seattle.

The foods used were locally sourced and all natural. The truck's fare has been described as barbecue, but Dammeier has stated that it is not barbecue, and that the fare derives its flavor from the sauces used.

A brick and mortar restaurant based on the truck, Max's, was projected to open in 2015. This location has been referred to as the "mothership" to the truck.

Reception
Maximus/Minimus received reviews and coverage on PBS, USA Today, NBC News, Parade, The Seattle Times, Seattle Weekly, The Stranger, and Modern Marvels (in an episode later repackaged as a Favorite Foods USA episode).

It was rated as one of "America’s top 15 street food vendors" by relish.com.

See also

List of food trucks
Street food

References

External links

2009 establishments in Washington (state)
Companies based in Seattle
Food trucks
Restaurants established in 2009